is a 1956 Japanese film directed by Teinosuke Kinugasa.

Cast 
 Kazuo Hasegawa as Hanpeita Tsukigata
 Machiko Kyō as Hagino
 Teinosuke Kinugasa
 Hideo Takamatsu as Daijiro Akamatsu
 Raizo Ichikawa as Tatsuma Hayase

References

External links 
  http://www.raizofan.net/link4/movie2/tsuki.htm
 

Japanese black-and-white films
1956 films
Films directed by Teinosuke Kinugasa
Daiei Film films
1950s Japanese films